Tosanoides obama, Obama's basslet, is a coral reef fish species from the subfamily Anthiinae part of the family Serranidae, the groupers and sea basses. It was discovered in Papahānaumokuākea Marine National Monument, Hawaii. Tosanoides obama was named after former US President Barack Obama in honor of his efforts to preserve natural environments including expanding the Papahānaumokuākea Marine National Monument. It was first discovered and described by Richard Pyle, Brian Greene and Randall Kosaki in December 2016. They also noted a distinctive spot on the male's dorsal fin reminiscent of Obama's campaign logo. The fish live in small groups in holes in reefs at a depth of around 90 m. Following the discovery the size of the reserve was increased.

Tosanoides obama is one of six species in the genus Tosanoides.

See also
 List of things named after Barack Obama
 List of organisms named after famous people (born 1950–present)

References

obama
Fish of the United States
Natural history of Hawaii
Taxa named by Richard Pyle
Taxa named by Brian Greene
Taxa named by Randall Kosaki
Fish described in 2016
Species named after Barack Obama